Destiny Deacon (born 1957) is an Indigenous Australian photographer and media artist. She has exhibited photographs and films across Australia and also internationally, focusing on politics and exposing the disparagement around Indigenous Australian cultures. She is credited with introducing the term "Blak" to refer to Indigenous Australians' contemporary art, culture and history.

Early life
Deacon was born in 1957 in Maryborough, Queensland, of the K'ua K'ua/Kuku of Far North Queensland (Kuku Yalanji?) and Erub/Mer (Torres Strait Islander) peoples.

Deacon relocated to Port Melbourne, Victoria, in 1959 with her mother Eleanor Harding, then married to Destiny's father wharf labourer and unionist Warren Deacon. Soon after, Deacon's parents separated and she and her siblings were raised by her mother with the help of a close Indigenous community. Growing up, Deacon and her family lived in various Melbourne inner suburbs including commission housing, which while often tough opened her eyes to a whole other world.

Deacon's interest in photography started at a very early age. However instead of pursuing photography Deacon decided to attend university and study politics, a field that her mother had been very interested and active within, with her involved with the United Council of Aboriginal Women. After attending the University of Melbourne and completing a Bachelor of Arts program in politics and obtaining a Diploma in teaching from La Trobe University, Deacon moved on to first become a history teacher across various community and secondary schools around Victoria, and then to a tutor and lecturer in Australian Writing and Culture, and Aboriginal and Torres Strait Islander Cultural Production at Melbourne University.

It wasn't until 1990 after a stint on community radio for 3CR that she decided to move into professional photography, after holding an exhibition with a few friends.

Artistic development
Before her foray into professional photography, Deacon became involved with Aboriginal activist Charles Perkins, working from Canberra as a staff trainer. Her strong interest in politics led her to become one of his "Angels", which was the beginning of her artistic endeavors.

Using what she had learnt about politics through Perkins, the "Angels", and her upbringing, Deacon started taking photographs of her culture using her trademark "black dollies" and other kitsch items as props to expose racism in Australia.

Aesthetics
Deacon said in an interview published in the Sydney Biennale 2000 "Photography is white people's invention. Lots of things seem really technical, for example the camera, the darkroom.. I've started taking the kind of pictures I do because I can't paint..and then I discovered it was a good way of expressing some feelings that lurk inside".

Deacon works across a spectrum of different mediums including photography, video, installation and performance, but her most prominent is her use of dolls to convey her message about the racism that exists within Australia. Deacon's photography polarises popular Anglo culture against Indigenous existence, creating satirical images, using Aboriginal imagery, found items, family members, and friends in very strange scenarios.

In Oz (1998) series Deacon incorporates Koori kitsch dolls and shows the construction of identity is an old game that she can play too. Using The Wizard of Oz as a starting point for her re-presentation of Aboriginal culture and identity, she recognises the fictionalising of history, identity and nationhood in Australia's past – a reminder that things are not always as they appear, nor what we have been made to believe; that history is written much similar to a story.

Deacon is said to have coined the term "Blak" as a reference to Indigenous Australian culture in 1991, in the series Blak lik mi, which was exhibited in 'Lisa Bellear, Brenda Croft and Destiny Deacon: Kudjeris' at Boomalli Aboriginal Artists Co-operative, Sydney, 13 November - 4 December. The phrase referenced the 1961 book Black Like Me by white American journalist John Howard Griffin, detailing his 1959 - 60 journey through the US Deep South disguised as African American during a time of racial segregation. The title of his book was taken from African American author Langston Hughes poem Dream Variations. Deacon has stated that she removed the 'c' from 'black' as a form of resistance to racial slurs expressed towards people of colour.

It is also suggested that Deacon is using a term possibly appropriated from American hip hop or rap, the intention behind it is that it "reclaim[s] historical, representational, symbolical, stereotypical and romanticised notions of Black or Blackness", and expresses taking back power and control within a society that does not give its Indigenous peoples much opportunity for self-determination as individuals and communities. Deacon herself said that it was "taking on the 'colonisers' language and flipping it on its head", as an expression of authentic urban Aboriginal identity.

Where's Mickey? (2003) shows the large difference between how Indigenous people are perceived by the white Australian population and the reality of her family and friends lives. Deacon has said about her work that the "Humour cuts deep. I like to think that there's a laugh and a tear in each".

Work and exhibitions
An early video work was "Home video" (1987). Deacon's first show, "Pitcha Mi Koori", was a part of the Melbourne Fringe Festival, and in 1991, her work was included in Aboriginal Women's Exhibition, at the Art Gallery of New South Wales in Sydney. Her first solo exhibition, Caste Offs, was held in 1993 at the Australian Centre for Photography in Sydney. Deacon's work began to be included in group exhibitions in 1994, including Blakness: Blak City Culture! at the Australian Centre for Contemporary Art in Melbourne, True Colours: Aboriginal and Torres Strait Islander Artists Raise the Flag at Bluecoat Gallery, Liverpool, UK; South London Gallery, London; City Gallery, Leicester and in Australia. "Welcome to My Koori World" (video, 1992) was shown at the Museum of Modern Art in New York in a show An Eccentric Orbit: Video Art in Australia, which was also picked up by ABC Television for the Blackout series.

In 1998 Deacon explored her mother's life by photographing her family in the Torres Strait Islands after her death two years previous, documenting it in a show titled Postcards from Mummy this journey "allowed her to come to come to terms with the loss of her mother and the importance of history, memory and place to identify".

Deacon's work has been featured in numerous local and international exhibitions such as Perspecta (1993, 1999), Havana Biennial (1994), Johannesburg Biennale (1995), Brisbane's Asia-Pacific Triennial of Contemporary Art (1996), Melbourne International Biennial (1999), Biennale of Sydney (2000), Yokohama Triennale (2001), Das Lied von der Erde (2001) and Documenta 11 (2002).

Walk & don’t look blak was Deacon's first large retrospective held at the Museum of Contemporary Art, Sydney, in 2004, encompassing the past 14 years of her work and practice. From there it toured the Ian Potter Museum of Art at Melbourne University, the Adam Art Gallery and the Wellington City Gallery in Wellington, New Zealand, the Tjibao Cultural Centre in Noumea, New Caledonia, and the Tokyo Metropolitan Museum of Photography in Japan. For 2004: Australian Culture Now at The Australian Centre for the Moving Image in Melbourne, Deacon was commissioned to make a film for the programme Neighbours (the remix).

In 2020 the National Gallery of Victoria mounted a retrospective exhibition of her work, the first in 15 years, curated by Indigenous curator Myles Russell-Cook, called DESTINY. Scheduled to run from 27 March to 9 August 2020, the opening of the gallery was delayed owing to the COVID-19 pandemic in Australia Russell-Cook also edited the mammoth Destiny, a monograph celebrating her art and life.

References

External links 
 Destiny Deacon at the Art Gallery of New South Wales

1957 births
Living people
20th-century Australian artists
20th-century Australian women artists
21st-century Australian artists
21st-century Australian women artists
Australian Aboriginal artists
Australian contemporary artists
Australian photographers
Australian women photographers
La Trobe University alumni
People from Maryborough, Queensland
Photographers from Melbourne
University of Melbourne alumni
University of Melbourne women
20th-century women photographers
21st-century women photographers
People educated at Mac.Robertson Girls' High School